Rahul's Arranged Marriage, is a 2005 silent Canadian film directed and produced by Anant Mathur, and is a short film.

Plot
The film revolves around a young man named Rahul whose father wants him to marry the daughter (Ishaa) of his old friend Mr. Kapoor. Rahul is quite modern and the concept of arranged marriage doesn't appeal to him. His father convinces Rahul to just meet Ishaa and if he's not interested he'll call it off. But when Rahul meets Ishaa, sparks fly.

Cast
 Sumeet Mathur - Rahul Shrivastava
 Devika Mathur - Ishaa
 Amar Kumar - Rahul's Grandfather
 Anurag Mathur - Mr. Shrivastava
 Anita Mathur - Mrs. Shrivastava
 Jyothi Rana - Mrs. Kapoor
 Abhishek Mathur - Mr. Kapoor
 Vineet Mathur - Ishaa's Brother
 Arvind Mathur - Waiter

Crew
 Anant Mathur - Producer, Director, Writer
 Amar Kumar - Assistant Director
 Archana Johnson - Hair Stylist, Make-Up Artist
 Anant Mathur - Cinematographer
 Amar Kumar - Script Supervisor
 Anant Mathur - Film Editor
 Anant Mathur - Sound Editor
 Sumeet Mathur - Key Grip
 Vineet Mathur - Second Assistant Director
 Dayal Mathur - Property Master

References

External links
 
 Masala! Mehndi! Masti! Winterfest at Harbourfront Centre

2005 films
Canadian black-and-white films
Canadian silent short films
2005 drama films
Films about Indian Canadians
2005 short films
Canadian drama short films
2000s Canadian films
Silent drama films